Driver may refer to:

Transportion

 A person whose occupation is driving
 Chauffeur, a person who drives an automobile as a job
 Motorman (locomotive), an electric vehicle driver
 Bus driver
 Truck driver
 SS Empire Driver or SS Driver, a cargo ship
 Driver (sail), a type of sail
 Driver Group, an Australian bus company

People
 Driver (surname)

Places
Driver, Arkansas, United States
Driver, Northern Territory, Australia
Drivers, Illinois, United States
Driver, Virginia, United States

Sport
 Wood (golf), a golf club
 Driver, a type of disc golf disc
 Driver, a position in water polo
 Driver, a kind of throw in professional wrestling

Computing and electronics
 Device driver, software used to interact with hardware devices
Driver (software), a general term for a programming interface to control and manage lower level interface(s)
 Database driver, application programming interface software used to interact with databases in accordance with Open Database Connectivity (ODBC) standard
In 3D computer animation, a driver of a property animates its value over time based some other property
 Driver circuit, in electronics, a circuit or component used to control another circuit or component
 Speaker driver, a transducer in a loudspeaker

Military
 HMS Driver, two British Royal Navy ships
 Driver (rank), British army rank

Arts and entertainment
 Driver (series), series of video games
 Driver (video game), the first game in the series
 Driver 2, the second game in the series
 Driver 3, the third game in the series
 Driver: Parallel Lines, the fourth game in the series
 Driver 76, a 2007 PSP game
 Driver: Vegas, a 2005 mobile game
 Driver: L.A. Undercover, a 2007 mobile game
 Driver: San Francisco, the fifth game in the series
 Driver: Renegade, a 2011 3DS game
 "Driver" (Blue October song)

See also
 The Driver (disambiguation)
 Drive (disambiguation)
 Pilot (disambiguation)
 Dorylus, the driver ant
 Screwdriver, mechanical device used to tighten or loosen screws
 Pile driver
 Drover
 Taxi Driver
 Train driver
 Co-driver